Frances is a town in the Australian state of South Australia located about  south-east of the state capital, Adelaide and about  north-east of the municipal seat of Naracoorte in the state's Limestone Coast region and adjoining the border with the State of Victoria.

Frances began as a government town first surveyed in July 1871 and then resurveyed in January.  Its name is reported as being derived from the name of the wife of "Mr Henry Jones of Binnum Station."  Boundaries of the locality were created in April 2001.

For much of its history, Frances was a railway town on the Mount Gambier railway line, which runs from Wolseley in the north to Mount Gambier in the south. A State Road, Frances Road, runs from Bordertown through Frances to Hynam. Despite the closure of the railway on 12 April 1995, Frances continues to be a receiving point for grain, with several silos. It also set a new record for the most grain received in a single day at the site.

Every February from 2000 to 2019, Frances hosted the Frances Folk Gathering, a weekend-long folk music festival, with the whole town given over to music and visitors.

Frances is located within the federal division of Barker, the state electoral district of MacKillop and the local government area of the Naracoorte Lucindale Council.

References
Notes

Citations

External links

Frances Folk Gathering website

Limestone Coast
Towns in South Australia